Moliço is the
Portuguese word for the submerged aquatic vegetation collected for use in agriculture. This word was derived from the Latin mollis, used for expressing the quality soft.

Meaning
The name moliço is generally used for vascular plants which grow in saline water, called in English  seagrasses, but it can also be applied to the macro algae growing together with the seagrasses.  Another type of macro algae, including the brown algae of the Sargassus genus is named sargaço. It is collected from the surf zone in the northern Portuguese beaches, and is also used in the agriculture.

Use
Moliço was particularly important in the coastal lagoon of Ria de Aveiro, on the northern Portuguese coast. There it was collected in large quantity by raking from typical sailing boats called moliceiro. The most abundant plant was the eelgrass, including Zostera marina, Zostera angustifolia and Zostera noltei and some other salt tolerant aquatic plants like Ruppia and Potamogeton. 

In the 19th and 20th centuries the collection of moliço had an important role in removing plant nutrients from the Ria de Aveiro helping to stabilize this eutrophic lagoon.

The moliceiro boat is long, pinewood built, belonging to the Mediterranean family of small boats which in Portuguese have the generic name bateira. One notable aspect of these boats is their ornamental paintings following strict rules of popular origin.

Portugal